Emmanuel "Manny" Maceda (born 1963) is a Filipino-American businessman. As a career management consultant, he was named worldwide managing partner of Bain & Company in November 2017 and took the helm in March 2018. Maceda is the first Asian leader in Bain & Company's history.

Early life
Manny Maceda was born in the United States and raised in the Philippines. He is the eldest son of the late Filipino politician Ernesto Maceda. He earned a bachelor's in chemical engineering from Illinois Institute of Technology where he graduated with the high honors (magna cum laude) and a masters in management from the MIT Sloan School of Management.

Career
After his studies at the Illinois Institute of Technology, Maceda started his career in the engineering plastics group of DuPont in 1984. Following this he attended a Master's in Management at MIT.

During his master's at MIT he was still "unaware of the existence of the management-consulting industry." While at Sloan, he persuaded one of his role models, Jack Welch, the chairman and chief executive of General Electric Co., to speak at the school. During the speech, a man wearing a gas mask threw a grenade-like object at Welch's feet. He stopped speaking and Maceda, correctly assessing that the object wasn't a real grenade, picked it up and walked it out of the building. Sometime later, Welch invited Maceda to lunch and introduced him to two top GE executives, the head of corporate strategy and the head of plastics marketing, Jeffrey Immelt, who would later become GE's chairman and CEO. Both offered Maceda jobs, but he decided to join Bain instead.

In 1988, Maceda joined Bain as a consultant. He specializes in "full potential" transformations involving strategy, performance improvement, customer loyalty and organizational effectiveness that result in meaningful long-term increase in enterprise value. He has worked with clients across a range of industries, including financial services, industrial products, consumer products, retail, telecommunications, energy and technology.

Before being appointed as the new worldwide director, Maceda led Bain's global Full Potential Transformation practice and was a member of the firm's Management Committee, Global Operating Committee and Nominating Committee. Previously he served as chairman of Bain's Asia-Pacific region. Before this he was a global leader of the Performance Improvement and Reengineering practices and leader of the global recruiting team. Meanwhile, he also published articles, such as in the MIT World Series, and spoke at the World Economic Forum.

In November 2017, Maceda was named the successor of Bob Bechek as the worldwide managing director of Bain & Company when Bechek stepped down in March 2018. Maceda stated to want to focus on the development of Bain's Digital practice.

He is a member of the MIT Sloan North American Advisory Board.

Personal life
Maceda is married to Lyra of the Rufino family. He and his wife and their four children currently live in San Francisco.

References

Related pages
 Bain & Company

1963 births
Living people